Boys Town is a village in Douglas County, Nebraska, United States. The population was 410 at the 2020 census. Boys Town is an enclave and a suburb of Omaha.

The village of Boys Town was established in 1917 as the headquarters of Father Flanagan's Boys' Home (Boys Town), founded by Father Edward J. Flanagan. It is dedicated to the care, treatment, and education of at-risk children.

Geography
Boys Town is located at  (41.260901, -96.131882).

Demographics

2010 census
At the 2010 census there were 745 people, 6 households, and 2 families living in the village. The racial makeup of the village was 66.0% White, 26.2% African American, 3.5% Native American, 0.4% Asian, 0.1% Pacific Islander, 1.6% from other races, and 2.1% from two or more races. Hispanic or Latino of any race were 10.1%.

Of the 6 households 16.7% had children under the age of 18 living with them, 33.3% were married couples living together, and 66.7% were non-families. 66.7% of households were one person and 16.7% were one person aged 65 or older. The average household size was 3.17 and the average family size was 3.00.

The median age in the village was 16.7 years. 72.8% of residents were under the age of 18; 10.9% were between the ages of 18 and 24; 13.2% were from 25 to 44; 2.8% were from 45 to 64; and 0.1% were 65 or older. The gender makeup of the village was 57.2% male and 42.8% female.

2000 census
At the 2000 census, there were 818 people, 57 households, and 53 families living in the village. The population density was 589.7 people per square mile (227.2/km). There were 58 housing units at an average density of 41.8 per square mile (16.1/km). The racial makeup of the village was 66.01% White, 21.15% African American, 1.34% Native American, 0.49% Asian, 5.01% from other races, and 5.99% from two or more races. Hispanic or Latino of any race were 7.58% of the population.

Of the 57 households 68.4% had children under the age of 18 living with them, 93.0% were married couples living together, and 7.0% were non-families. 7.0% of households were one person and 5.3% were one person aged 65 or older. The average household size was 3.32 and the average family size was 3.47.

The age distribution was 78.9% under the age of 18, 8.9% from 18 to 24, 11.0% from 25 to 44, 0.7% from 45 to 64, and 0.5% 65 or older. The median age was 16 years. For every 100 females, there were 219.5 males. For every 100 females age 18 and over there were 150.7 males.

The median household income was $51,442, and the median family income  was $51,944. Males had a median income of $31,563 versus $21,042 for females. The per capita income for the village was $3,048. None of the families and 6.1% of the population were living below the poverty line, including none under 18 and none of those over 64.

Education
It is in Millard Public Schools.

References

External links

 

Villages in Douglas County, Nebraska
Villages in Nebraska